The Gudžiūnai Forest is a forest mostly in Radviliškis District Municipality, central Lithuania, located to the south of Baisogala and to the north east of Gudžiūnai. It covers 11.8 km2 area. The rivers Liaudė and Garduva drain the forest. 

38 % of the area is covered by birch, 41 % by spruce, 6 % by ash, 5 % by black alder, 9 % by aspen combined with oak and other tree groups. Vilnius-Šiauliai railway goes across the forest.

References

Forests of Lithuania
Radviliškis District Municipality